"Headlong Flight" is the second single from Canadian rock band Rush's 19th studio album, Clockwork Angels. It was released to radio stations and for online preview on April 19, 2012, and became available digitally and on disk April 24, 2012. A lyrics video was also made available on YouTube. In an interview with Rolling Stone, Geddy Lee commented on the song:

Musically, the song contains elements inspired by "Bastille Day," another Rush song. In a 2012 interview, Neil Peart confirmed this was deliberate.

Live performances of the song during the Clockwork Angels Tour and R40 Live Tour incorporated a short drum solo by Peart, titled "Drumbastica."

Track listing
Music by Lee/Lifeson, lyrics by Peart

Chart performance

Personnel 
Geddy Lee – lead vocals, bass, bass pedals, keyboards
Alex Lifeson – guitar
Neil Peart – drums, percussion

See also
List of Rush songs

References

2012 singles
Rush (band) songs
Songs written by Alex Lifeson
Songs written by Geddy Lee
Songs written by Neil Peart
2012 songs
Song recordings produced by Nick Raskulinecz
Roadrunner Records singles